The Honorable Congress of the State of Tabasco is the legislative branch of  the government of the State of Tabasco. The Congress is the governmental deliberative body of  Tabasco, which is equal to, and independent of, the executive. It is located in front of the Plaza de Armas, in the historic center of the city of Villahermosa, capital of the state.

The Congress is unicameral and consists of 35 deputies. 21 deputies are elected on a first-past-the-post basis, one for each district in which the entity is divided, while 14 are elected through a system of proportional representation. Deputies are elected to serve for a three-year term.

Since its installation the congress has been renewed 62 times, hence the current session of the Congress of Tabasco (whose term lasts from 2018 to 2021) is known as the LXIII Legislature.

See also
List of Mexican state congresses

External links
Congress of Tabasco website

Tabasco, Congress of
Tabasco
Government of Tabasco